Princess Katarzyna Ostrogska (1560–1579) was a Ruthenian noblewoman. She was famed for the Siege of Dubna in 1577, which was sieged by nomads with the purpose of take to her prisoner.

She married Krzysztof Mikołaj Radziwiłł on 22 July 1578 in Dubno.

See also

 House of Ostrogski
 List of szlachta

External links
 "Ostrozky", Liubomyr Vynar, Encyclopedia of Ukraine, vol. 3 (1993)
 Ostrogski family

1560 births
1579 deaths
Kateryna 1560
Polish–Lithuanian Commonwealth people